The Tehuantepec striped snake (Geagras redimitus) is a snake endemic to  Mexico.

References 

Colubrids
Monotypic snake genera
Reptiles described in 1875